The fluoronickelates are a class of chemical compounds containing an anion with nickel at its core, surrounded by fluoride ions which act as ligands. This makes it a fluoroanion. The nickel atom can be in a range of oxidation states from +2, +3 to +4. 
The hexafluoronickelate(IV)2− ion NiF62− contains nickel in the maximal +4 state, and is in octahedral coordination by the fluoride atoms. It forms a commercially available salt Potassium hexafluoronickelate(IV) K2NiF6. Solid double salts can also contain tetrafluoronickelate NiF4 eg K2NiF4.

References

Nickel complexes
Fluoro complexes
Fluorometallates